The Sardar Patel Renewable Energy Research Institute (SPRERI) is a private non-profit research institution located in Anand, Gujarat, India. It primarily focuses on renewable energy production from solar energy, microorganism, biomass and various types of wastes.

History

It was established at Anand, Gujarat in January 1979 by a group of philanthropists and visionary led by late Dr. H.M. Patel and Late Shri Nanubhai Amin. It is a non-profit autonomous organization registered as a Society under the Societies Registration Act 21 of 1860. It is a Public Trust under the Bombay Public Trust Act 1950. It has been approved as a Research Association for the purpose of clause (ii) of subsection (1) of Section 35 of the Income Tax Act 1961 and is recognized as a Scientific and Industrial Research Organization (SIRO) by the Department of Science and Technology, Govt. of India. In addition, it is recognized by Sardar Patel University, Vallabh Vidyanagar, Junagadh Agricultural University, Junagadh, Nirma University, Ahmadabad as a center for education, training, and research.

Research Divisions

 Solar Energy Division
 Bio-Conversion Technology Division
 Thermo-chemical Conversion Division
 Technology Transfer Division

Research and development

Consultancy : Design, development, commissioning and monitoring the performance of renewable devices and systems, organizing seminars, workshops, business meets, etc.

Testing : Performance testing of renewable devices and systems for the purpose of certification and product improvement.

Training : For users, technicians, students, teachers and researchers, fabricators, financiers and policy makers.

External links
 Official website
 Feature on Sardar Patel Renewable Energy Research Institute (SPRERI)

See also
 Education in India
 Education in Gujarat

Education in Anand district
Research institutes in Gujarat
Anand district

India
Research institutes established in 1979
1979 establishments in Gujarat